George Gray Leiper (February 3, 1786 – November 18, 1868) was a Jacksonian member of the U.S. House of Representatives from Pennsylvania.

Biography
Born in Philadelphia, Pennsylvania on February 3, 1786, George Gray Leiper was a son of businessman Thomas Leiper. Educated in his community's common schools and an 1803 graduate of the University of Pennsylvania, he relocated in 1810 to Ridley Township, Delaware County, Pennsylvania, which was known at the time as "Lapidea." While there, he engaged in logging. He also operated bark mills and stone quarries.

In 1814, Leiper served as a first lieutenant with the Delaware County Fencibles, and performed his duties near Brandywine Creek. 

A member of the Pennsylvania House of Representatives in 1822 and 1823, he was elected as a Jacksonian to the Twenty-first Congress, during which time, he was the chair of the United States House Committee on Expenditures in the Department of the Treasury. 

He was not a candidate for renomination in 1830, but, instead, resumed the management of his quarry properties. He was then appointed as an associate judge of the courts of Delaware County on February 25, 1843. Reappointed to that position on February 16, 1848, he served until December 1, 1851, when the office became elective.

Death and interment
Leiper died at his home, “Lapidea,” on Crum Creek in Delaware County, Pennsylvania on November 18, 1868, and was interred in the Ridley Presbyterian Church Cemetery in Ridley Township, Pennsylvania.

See also
Thomas Leiper Estate – his father's estate on Crum Creek

References

Members of the Pennsylvania House of Representatives
Pennsylvania state court judges
1786 births
1868 deaths
People from Ridley Township, Pennsylvania
Jacksonian members of the United States House of Representatives from Pennsylvania
Politicians from Philadelphia
Burials in Pennsylvania
19th-century American politicians